Klifox Oniel Bernárdez Valerio (born 18 September 1994) is a Honduran footballer who plays as a left back for C.D. Real Sociedad in the Honduran top division.

Club career

Motagua
At the age of 19, Bernárdez made his professional debut with F.C. Motagua on 3 August 2014 in the 1–1 away draw against C.D. Real Sociedad in Tocoa.  In 2015, he was almost signed by Juticalpa F.C., however, the transfer did not take place.  In January 2019, he was announced as a new signing for Juticalpa, however, since he had already played a game for F.C. Motagua Reserves that season, the transfer could not be finalized, making this the second time his transfer to this club is frustrated.

International career

Under-23
In 2015, Bernárdez represented Honduras at the 2015 CONCACAF Men's Olympic Qualifying Championship, a team which eventually qualified to the 2016 Summer Olympics.

References

External links

1994 births
Living people
Association football defenders
Honduran footballers
F.C. Motagua players
Liga Nacional de Fútbol Profesional de Honduras players
People from La Ceiba